Orlok may refer to:
Count Orlok, a fictional character from the film Nosferatu
Orlok the Assassin, a fictional character from the comic strip Judge Dredd
The Beast of Orlok, a story based on the television series Doctor Who

See also
Orlov (disambiguation)
Kho Orluk